Joseph Schuster (11 August 174824 July 1812) was a German composer.

Life and career
Schuster was born in Dresden, where he received his first musical training from his father, a court musician, and from Johann Georg Schürer. Thanks to a scholarship from the Saxon Prince-electors, he was able to study with Giovanni Battista Martini and counterpoint in Venice with G. Pera from 1765 to 1768. In 1776 he completed his first opera seria Didone abbandonata, after a libretto by Metastasio. It was given at the Teatro San Carlo in Naples and by all accounts a great success. In the same year, the opera seria Demofoonte premiered in Forlì.

In the following years, Schuster's position was solidified with operatic successes in Naples and Venice. He was also recognized in Germany as an accomplished composer and his singspiel, Der Alchymist, oder Der Liebesteufel is considered one of the finest examples of the art form. Most of his works are assigned to the opera buffa, but he also composed religious works, chamber music and orchestral music.

Schuster's work is also found in the string quartets appendix of the Köchel catalogue (No. 210 et seq,), and for a long time the "Milan Quartets" (1772–73) were viewed as Mozart works. Schuster composed these works around 1780, which were long considered to be copies of Mozart originals. The musicologist Ludwig Finscher was able to uncover the true origin (in The Music Research, 1966).

Schuster died at Dresden.

Selected works
 Oratorio - La passione di Gesù Cristo 1778, Dresden.
 La fedeltà in amore, Opera buffa, Dresda 1773
 L'idolo cinese, Opera buffa, Dresda 1776
 La Didone abbandonata, Opera seria, Napoli 1776
 Demofoonte, Opera seria, Forlì 1776
 L'amore artigiano, Opera buffa, Venezia 1776
 La schiava liberata, Opera seria-comica, Dresden 1777
 Der Alchymist oder Der Liebesteufel, Singspiel, Dresden 1778
 Die wüste Insel, Singspiel (after Metastasio, L'Isola disabitata), Leipzig 1779
 Bradamante, Dramma per musica, Padova 1779
 Creso in Media, Opera seria, Napoli 1779
 Amor e Psyche, Opera seria, Napoli 1780
 Ester, Oratorio, Venezia 1781
 Il marito indolente, Opera buffa, Dresden 1782
 Rübezahl ossia Il vero amore, Opera buffa, Dresden 1789
 Osmano dey d'Algeri, Opera buffa, Dresden 1800
 Il giorno natalizio, Opera buffa (Pasticcio), Dresden 1802
 Quartetti Nr. 1-6 „Quartetti Padovani“
 6 Divertimenti da camera per pianoforte e violino, 1777, Kassel

Sources
 Burde, Ines: "Joseph Schuster", Die Musik in Geschichte und Gegenwart, 2006. — Is. 15, pg. 353–355
 Ongley, Laurie: Liturgical Musc in late eighteenth-century Dresden: Johann Gottlieb Naumann, Joseph Schuster, and Franz Seydelmann. New Heaven, 1992.

Further reading

External links

 
 
 
  
 

1748 births
1812 deaths
German Classical-period composers
German opera composers
Male opera composers
German male classical composers
19th-century German male musicians
String quartet composers